IBM Db2 Query Management Facility (QMF) for z/OS  is business analytics software developed by IBM. It was originally created to be the reporting interface for the IBM Db2 for z/OS database and is used to generate reports for business decisions. In its inception QMF's reports were "green-screen" reports that could be accessed online. QMF handles data not just from Db2 for z/OS, but also other structured and unstructured data sources such as Oracle, Teradata, Adabas, Hadoop, and webpages.  Its dashboards and reports can be deployed via a workstation GUI, a browser, or a tablet or can be embedded within applications.

References

External websites
 Official IBM site

IBM DB2
Database administration tools
IBM mainframe software